Some Things Just Stick in Your Mind – Singles and Demos 1964 to 1967 is a compilation album by Vashti Bunyan collecting her mid-sixties singles cuts (including the Jagger/Richards penned title track) with unreleased demos recorded at the time. Disc two features her recently rediscovered first studio demo session from 1964 in its entirety. A special limited-edition version adds four bonus tracks (numbers 14-17) to disc one.

The album was released in the USA by DiChristina.

Track listing
Except where noted, all tracks are written by Vashti Bunyan.

Editions

Notes and references

Vashti Bunyan albums
2007 compilation albums
FatCat Records compilation albums